Alan Burnett (born February 17, 1950) is an American television writer-producer particularly associated with Warner Bros. Animation, Hanna-Barbera Productions, DC Comics, and Walt Disney television animation. He has had a hand in virtually every DC animated project since the waning years of the Super Friends. Burnett's contributions for Disney were largely a part of the 1990s Disney Afternoon, where he was attached to the Disney's Adventures of the Gummi Bears and various projects set in the Scrooge McDuck universe. Because of his primary focus on televised animation, he has occasionally been involved in film projects related to a parent television program. He is a graduate of the University of Florida and has an MFA in film production from the University of Southern California.

Filmography

Film

Television

Comic books
Burnett wrote Superman/Batman, The Flash  and Justice League of America storylines.

Awards and nominations 
The following is a list of accolades received by Burnett.

References

External links

New York Times Movie section on Alan Burnett

1950 births
American television writers
American male television writers
American comics writers
Place of birth missing (living people)
Living people
University of Florida alumni
Walt Disney Animation Studios people
Hanna-Barbera people
DC Comics people
USC School of Cinematic Arts alumni
Inkpot Award winners
Warner Bros. Animation people